Barrios is a Spanish surname. Notable people with the surname include:

Agustín Barrios (1885–1944), Paraguayan guitarist and composer
Ángel Barrios (1882–1964), Spanish guitarist and composer
Arturo Barrios (born 1962), Mexican athlete
Bayang Barrios (born 1968), Filipino musician
Edison Barrios (born 1988), Venezuelan professional baseball player
Eduardo Barrios (1884–1963), Chilean writer
Gerardo Barrios (1813–1865), President of El Salvador (1859-1863)
Gonzalo Barrios (politician) (1902–1993), Venezuelan politician
Gonzalo Barrios (esports player) (born 1995), Chilean-American Super Smash Bros. player
Gracia Barrios (1927–2020), Chilean painter
Ignacio Barrios (1930–2013), Mexican painter
Jarrett Barrios (born 1969), American politician, President of the Gay & Lesbian Alliance Against Defamation (GLAAD)
Jorge Barrios (footballer) (born 1961), Uruguayan footballer
Jorge Rodrigo Barrios (born 1976), Argentine boxer
Juan Luis Barrios (born 1983), Mexican athlete
Justo Rufino Barrios (1835–1885), President of Guatemala (1873-1885)
Lucas Barrios (born 1984), Argentine-born Paraguayan footballer
Lucho Barrios (born 1935), Peruvian musician
Luis Barrios (born 1990), Peruvian basketball player
Lya Barrioz, Nicaraguan singer and actress whose real name is Ligia Barrios
Manuel Barrios (born 1974), Panamanian baseball player
Sonny Barrios, Filipino basketball player
Teófilo Barrios (born 1964), Paraguayan football (soccer) defender
Yarelis Barrios (born 1983), Cuban discus thrower

See also
 Barrio (surname)

References

Spanish-language surnames